Senator Gage may refer to:

Delwyn Gage (born 1930), Montana State Senate
George Gage (politician) (1813–1899), Illinois State Senate
Joshua Gage (1763–1831), Massachusetts State Senate
Kelly Gage (1925–2017), Minnesota State Senate